Claudia Roth Pierpont is a writer and journalist. She has been a contributor to The New Yorker since 1990 and became a staff writer in 2004. Her subjects have included Friedrich Nietzsche, Katharine Hepburn, Mae West, Orson Welles, the Ballets Russes and the Chrysler Building.

A collection of eleven of Pierpont’s New Yorker essays, Passionate Minds: Women Rewriting the World, was published in 2000. Nominated for a National Book Critics Circle Award, the book juxtaposes the lives and works of women writers, including Hannah Arendt, Gertrude Stein, Anaïs Nin, Ayn Rand, Margaret Mitchell and Zora Neale Hurston. Her biography of writer Philip Roth, Roth Unbound: A Writer and His Books, was published by Farrar, Straus and Giroux in October 2013 and has since been translated into several languages. Her book about the Chrysler Building, American Rhapsody: Writers, Musicians, Movie Stars, and One Great Building, was published in 2016.

Pierpont has been the recipient of a Whiting Award, a Guggenheim Fellowship and a fellowship at the Cullman Center for Scholars and Writers of the New York Public Library.

Pierpont lives in New York City. She graduated from Barnard College in 1979 and holds a Ph.D. in Italian Renaissance art history from New York University. She has been a professor of creative journalism at New York University and Columbia University.

She is the mother of author Julia Pierpont.

Bibliography

Roth Unbound: A Writer and His Books. (2013)
American Rhapsody: Writers, Musicians, Movie Stars, and One Great Building. (2016)

References

External links
Profile at The Whiting Foundation

Living people
Year of birth missing (living people)
The New Yorker staff writers
American women journalists
20th-century American journalists
20th-century American women writers
21st-century American journalists
21st-century American biographers
American women biographers
21st-century American women writers
Barnard College alumni
New York University alumni